Stefanowice may refer to the following places in Poland:
Stefanowice, Lower Silesian Voivodeship (south-west Poland)
Stefanowice, Greater Poland Voivodeship (west-central Poland)